The Southern States Athletic Conference (SSAC) is a college athletic conference affiliated with the National Association of Intercollegiate Athletics (NAIA). The 11 member universities that compete in 19 sports are located in Louisiana, Mississippi, Alabama and Georgia. Basketball teams compete as a single division in the NAIA.

History
The Southern States Athletic Conference was established as the Georgia–Alabama–Carolina Conference (GACC) on March 16, 1999. On June 27, 2004, the conference changed its name to the Southern States Athletic Conference.

Chronological timeline

 1999 - On March 16, 1999, the Southern States Athletic Conference (SSAC) was founded as the Georgia–Alabama–Carolina Conference (GACC). Charter members included Auburn University at Montgomery, Brenau University, Brewton–Parker College, Emmanuel College, Faulkner University, Georgia Southwestern State University, North Georgia College & State University (now the University of North Georgia), Shorter College (now Shorter University), Southern Polytechnic State University, and Southern Wesleyan University beginning the 1999-2000 academic year.
 2000 – Reinhardt College (now Reinhardt University) joined the GACC in the 2000–01 academic year. 
 2004 - On June 27, 2004, the GACC was rebranded as the Southern States Athletic Conference (SSAC) in the 2004–05 academic year.
 2004 - Berry College and Lee University joined the SSAC in the 2004–05 academic year.
 2005 - North Georgia left the SSAC and the NAIA to join the Division II ranks of the National Collegiate Athletic Association (NCAA) and the Peach Belt Conference (PBC) after the 2004–05 academic year.
 2005 - Columbia College of South Carolina joined the SSAC in the 2005–06 academic year.
 2006 - Georgia Southwestern State left the SSAC and the NAIA to join the NCAA Division II ranks and the Peach Belt (PBC) after the 2005–06 academic year.
 2009 - Reinhardt left the SSAC to join the Appalachian Athletic Conference (AAC) after the 2008–09 academic year.
 2010 - Berry left the SSAC and the NAIA to join the NCAA Division III ranks as an Division III Independent (which would later join the Southern Athletic Association (SAA) beginning the 2012–13 academic year) after the 2009–10 academic year.
 2010 - Belhaven University, Loyola University New Orleans, the University of Mobile, Spring Hill College, Truett–McConnell College (now Truett–McConnell University), and William Carey University joined the SSAC in the 2010–11 academic year.
 2011 - Columbia (S.C.) left the SSAC to join the Appalachian (AAC) after the 2010–11 academic year.
 2012 - Shorter left the SSAC and the NAIA to join the NCAA Division II ranks and the Gulf South Conference (GSC) after the 2011–12 academic year.
 2012 - The College of Coastal Georgia joined the SSAC in the 2012–13 academic year.
 2016 - Lee left the SSAC and the NAIA to join the NCAA Division II ranks and the Gulf South (GSC) after the 2012–13 academic year.
 2013 - Bethel University of Tennessee, Blue Mountain College, and Martin Methodist College (now the University of Tennessee Southern) joined the SSAC in the 2013–14 academic year.
 2014 - Three institutions left the SSAC and the NAIA to join the NCAA Division II ranks and their respective new home primary conferences: Emmanuel (Ga.) and Southern Wesleyan to the Conference Carolinas (CC) and Spring Hill to the Southern Intercollegiate Athletic Conference (SIAC). Southern Poly announced that it would drop its athletic program and close once being consolidated by Kennesaw State University. All changes were effective after the 2013–14 academic year.
 2014 - Dalton State College and Middle Georgia State University joined the SSAC in the 2014–15 academic year.
 2015 - Belhaven left the SSAC and the NAIA to join the NCAA Division III ranks and the American Southwest Conference after the 2014–15 academic year.
 2016 - Auburn–Montgomery left the SSAC and the NAIA to join the NCAA Division II ranks as an NCAA D-II Independent (which would later join the Gulf South (GSC) beginning the 2017-18 academic year) after the 2015–16 academic year.
 2017 - Two institutions left the SSAC to join their respective new home primary conferences: Brenau to join the Appalachian (AAC) and Coastal Georgia to join the Sun Conference, both effective after the 2016–17 academic year.
 2018 - Florida College and Stillman College joined the SSAC in the 2018–19 academic year.
 2020 - Bethel (Tenn.) and Martin Methodist left the SSAC to join the Mid-South Conference (MSC) after the 2019–20 academic year.
 2021 - Florida College left the SSAC to become an NAIA Independent within the Continental Athletic Conference after the 2020–21 academic year.
 2021 - Talladega College joined the SSAC in the 2021–22 academic year.
 2022 - Life University joined the SSAC in the 2022–23 academic year.
 2022 - Point University and Thomas University will join the SSAC (with the University of Tennessee Southern, formerly Martin Methodist, re-joining) beginning the 2023–24 academic year.

Member schools

Current members
The SSAC currently has 11 full members, all but two are private schools:

Notes
 Middle Georgia State pending approval from the NCAA will leave the SSAC for Division 2 Peach Belt Conference in 2025 projected.
 Talladega pending approval from the NCAA will leave the SSAC for Division 2 Southern Intercollegiate Athletic Conference in 2024 projected.

Future members
The SSAC will have three future full members for the 2023–24 school year:

Notes

Former members
The SSAC had 19 former full members, all but five were private schools. School names and nicknames reflect those used in the final school year of SSAC membership:

Notes

Membership timeline

Sports

The SSAC holds championships in the following 19 sports:

References

External links

 
College sports in Alabama
College sports in Georgia (U.S. state)
College sports in Louisiana
College sports in Mississippi
College sports in Tennessee